Guillo Pérez (birth name Guillermo Pérez Chicon, August 3, 1923 – March 9, 2014) was a Dominican painter, who made more than seventy exhibitions in general, participating in international group exhibitions. He is considered one of the most prolific and important canvas artists of the Dominican Republic.

Biography
Guillo Pérez was son of Francisco Pérez Tavárez and Ana Luisa Chicón Hernández (daughter of Francisco Chicón Wagner and Eulalia Hernández Castro).

During his early years, Guillo Perez made religious studies and studied music learning to play the violin. He headed to the School of Fine Arts in Santiago in 1950. In 1952 he was appointed professor and settled in Santo Domingo, until 1955 where he began a series of exhibitions, both individual and collective.

He also served as president of the Dominican Association of Artists, and was director of the School of Fine Arts in La Vega and the School of Fine Arts in Santo Domingo.

Guillo Pérez died in Santo Domingo on March 9, 2014 due to health complications.

Style
Pérez preferred oil on canvas, and used a spatula to achieve strong fillings. His style was based on abstract expressionism.

Working in a more structured style, ordering on the web recognizable symbols. Among his works issues such as colonial monuments, marinas, figures, landscapes, flowers, banana leaves and roosters; All Threads Wits (carts, oxen and hamlets) allow a contemplative and poetic visual impressive ambient brightness.

Gallery

References

External links
Galería Guillo Pérez

1923 births
2014 deaths
20th-century Dominican Republic painters
20th-century Dominican Republic artists
Male painters
20th-century male artists
Dominican Republic male artists
People from Moca, Dominican Republic
Dominican Republic people of German descent
Dominican Republic people of Spanish descent
White Dominicans